This is a list of seasons completed by the Los Angeles Kings of the National Hockey League. This list documents the records and playoff results for all seasons the Kings have completed in the NHL since their inception in 1967.

Table key

Year by year

1 Season was shortened due to the 1994–95 NHL lockout.
2 Season was cancelled due to the 2004–05 NHL lockout.
3 As of the 2005–06 NHL season, all games tied after overtime will be decided in a shootout; SOL (Shootout losses) will be recorded as OTL in the standings.
4 Season was shortened due to the 2012–13 NHL lockout.
5 Season was suspended on March 12, 2020 due to the COVID-19 pandemic.
6 Season was shortened due to the COVID-19 pandemic.

All-time records

References

Los Angeles seasons and records @ hockeydb.com

 
National Hockey League team seasons
Sea
Los Angeles Kings